Başbakanlık Konutu was the official residence of the Prime Minister of Turkey, where they lived and held most of their official meetings, until 2014.

Official residences in Turkey
Buildings and structures in Ankara
Prime ministerial residences
Prime Ministers of Turkey